Kollo is a large town and urban commune in southwestern Niger, where NGOs work, as well as, missionaries and Peace Corps volunteers. It lies in the Kollo Department of the Tillabéri Region.

Transport 
Currently, Kollo can be accessed by its main road.

There are bush taxis available as well as urban buses from Niamey. City taxies generally do not go to Kollo. They will stop in Libore unless you pay a little more. It is proposed to be served by a station on a future railway network.

Sister city
 Enid, Oklahoma, United States, was declared as Kollo's sister city on August 1, 2010.

See also 
 Railway stations in Niger

References 

Populated places in Niger
Communes of Tillabéri Region